Evolutionary epidemiology consists in simultaneously analysing how parasites spread and evolve.

References

Epidemiology